The Eucosmini are a tribe of tortrix moths.

Genera

Unplaced species
"Acroclita" macroma Turner, 1918
"Eucosma" atelosticta Meyrick, 1925
"Eucosma" cathareutis Meyrick, 1938
"Eucosma" chloromima Meyrick, 1931
"Eucosma" chlorosticha Meyrick, 1934
"Eucosma" pentagonaspis Meyrick, 1931
"Eucosma" rigens Meyrick, 1938
"Eucosma" symploca Turner, 1946
"Eucosma" tholeropis Meyrick, 1934

Formerly placed here
Argepinotia

References

 
Olethreutinae
Taxa named by Edward Meyrick